Alexander House may refer to:

United States 
(by state then city)
 Old Alexander House, Magnolia, Arizona, listed on the National Register of Historic Places (NRHP) in Columbia County
 Ashley-Alexander House, Scott, Arizona, NRHP-listed in Lonoke County
 Alexander House (Salida, Colorado), NRHP-listed
Cecil and Hermione Alexander House, Atlanta, Georgia, NRHP-listed
 Alexander-Cleveland House, Ruckersville, Georgia, NRHP-listed in Georgia
 Gilbert-Alexander House, Washington, Georgia, NRHP-listed in Georgia
 Alexander House (Boise, Idaho), NRHP-listed in Idaho]]
 Alexander Plantation House, Midway, Kentucky, NRHP-listed in Kentucky
 Allen-Alexander House, Paris, Kentucky, NRHP-listed in Kentucky
 Simeon Alexander Jr. House, Northfield, Massachusetts, NRHP-listed in Massachusetts
 Arad Alexander House, Worcester, Massachusetts, NRHP-listed in Massachusetts
 Alexander and Busey Houses, Kalispell, Montana, NRHP-listed in Montana
 Ryons-Alexander House, Lincoln, Nebraska, NRHP-listed in Nebraska
 Mrs. Minnie Alexander Cottage, Asheville, North Carolina, NRHP-listed in North Carolina
 Hezekiah Alexander House, Charlotte, North Carolina, NRHP-listed in North Carolina
 Neal Somers Alexander House, Charlotte, North Carolina, NRHP-listed in North Carolina
 William T. Alexander House, Charlotte, North Carolina, NRHP-listed in North Carolina
 Dr. William S. Alexander House, Oxford, Ohio, NRHP-listed in Ohio
 Alexander–Hill House, Seneca, South Carolina, NRHP-listed in South Carolina
 Alexander House (Spartanburg, South Carolina), NRHP-listed in South Carolina
 John Alexander House, Maryville, Tennessee, NRHP-listed in Tennessee
 Alexander-Campbell House, Abilene, Texas, NRHP-listed in Texas
 William D. Alexander House, Provo, Utah, NRHP-listed in Utah
 Milldean and Alexander-Davis House, Grafton, Vermont, NRHP-listed in Vermont
 Alexander-Withrow House, Lexington, Virginia, NRHP-listed in Virginia
 James Alexander House, Spottswood, Virginia, NRHP-listed in Virginia

United Kingdom
 Alexander House, Corsham, a grade II* listed house at High Street, Corsham, Wiltshire, England